A teen or teenager is a person between the ages of 13 and 19.

Teen is the suffix used to form the name of the numerals of numbers 13 to 19.

Teen or teens may also refer to:

 Teen (magazine), an American lifestyle magazine targeted at teens
 Alfred "Teen" Blackburn (1842–1951), American Confederate Civil War veteran
 ESRB Teen Rating
 TEEN (band), an American musical band from Brooklyn

See also
 Teen language (disambiguation) (incl. Téén, Thiin)
 Teen magazine, a genre of magazine targeted at youth
 Teen drama, a genre of television that centers on teenage characters
 Teen film, a genre of films targeted at youth
 Teen idol, a person seen as an idol by teenagers
 Teenager (disambiguation), same meaning
 Tens (disambiguation)